Ege Aydan (born 15 June 1958) is a Turkish actor. He has appeared in more than thirty films since 1974.

Selected filmography

References

External links 

1958 births
Living people
Turkish male film actors
Male actors from Ankara